Kurz government may refer to two government cabinets in Austria:
 the First Kurz government (2017–2019)
 the Second Kurz government (2020–2021)